Szandra Szalay (born 30 July 1989 in Tatabánya), is a Hungarian professional triathlete and the third best Hungarian triathlete of the year 2010 according to the Hungarian Ranglista, i.e. National Championship Series.

In 2007, Szandra Szalay took part in her first ITU triathlon and won the Junior European Cup in Tiszaújváros, as in 2008, the year in which she won the silver medal at the European Championships.
Since 2006 Szandra Szalay represents the club ORTRI, located in Oroszlány near her hometown Tatabánya. Her coach is Licskó Csaba.
Together with Zsófia Tóth, until 2008 also a member of ORTRI, and Zsófia Kovács Szandra Szalay may be considered one of Hungary's most promising hopes for the Olympic Games in London 2012.

In 2011, Szalay will also take part in the German Bundesliga circuit and represent the team EJOT.

Szandra Szalay attended the Váci Mihály Általános Iskola elementary school and the Péch Antal Műszaki Szakközép Iskola és Gimnázium highschool in Tatabánya.

ITU Competitions 
In the four years from 2007 to 2010 Szandra Szalay took part in 29 ITU competitions and achieved 10 top ten positions.
The following list is based upon the official ITU rankings and the athlete's Profile Page. Unless indicated otherwise all events are triathlons and belong to the Elite category.

BG = the sponsor British Gas · DNF = did not finish · DNS = did not start

External links
 Szalay's Hungarian Club ORTRI in Hungarian
 Heraklesz promotion scheme: Szalay's Profile Page in Hungarian
 Hungarian Triathlon Federation in Hungarian

Notes

1989 births
Living people
People from Tatabánya
Hungarian female triathletes
Sportspeople from Komárom-Esztergom County